Melica harfordii is a species of grass known by the common name Harford's oniongrass.

Distribution
It is native to western North America from British Columbia to California, where it grows in many types of habitat, including mountain forests and open hillsides. It is found in the foothills and higher elevations of the Sierra Nevada.

Description

The inflorescence is a narrow series of spikelets tipped with nearly invisible awns.

External links
Jepson Manual Treatment — Melica harfordii
Grass Manual Treatment
Melica harfordii — Photo gallery

harfordii
Bunchgrasses of North America
Grasses of the United States
Grasses of Canada
Native grasses of California
Flora of the West Coast of the United States
Flora of the Klamath Mountains
Flora of the Sierra Nevada (United States)
Flora of British Columbia
Natural history of the California chaparral and woodlands
Natural history of the California Coast Ranges
Flora without expected TNC conservation status